Oussama Alou (born 15 January 2002) is a Dutch footballer who plays for Canadian Premier League club York United FC.

Early life
Alou began playing youth football with USV Elinkwijk.  In 2013, he joined the youth system of FC Utrecht. He signed a professional contract with Utrecht in 2018, at the age of 16. In January 2020, he extended his contract through June 2023.

Club career
He made his senior debut on August 28, 2020 for the second team, Jong FC Utrecht in the second tier Eerste Divisie, against FC Eindhoven. He scored his first professional goal on 4 January 2021 against FC Den Bosch. In August 2022, he terminated his contract with the club by mutual consent.

In January 2023, he joined Canadian Premier League club York United, signing a one year contract, with club options for 2024 and 2025.

International career
In June 2021, Alou was called up to the Morocco U20 team for a training camp.

References

External links
 

2002 births
Living people
Dutch footballers
Association football midfielders
USV Elinkwijk players
Jong FC Utrecht players
Eerste Divisie players
York United FC players
Dutch people of Moroccan descent